Thea E. Smith is the author of two novels: She Let Herself Go and Me, Myself, and Her. She makes her home in Halifax, Nova Scotia. She is the great-granddaughter of Arthur Powell Davis and of Theobald Smith, and the granddaughter of Sophocles Papas, founder of the Columbia Music Company, Inc.

References

External links
 Bio at the Writers' Federation of Nova Scotia
 Review of She let herself go by Robert Scott Stewart
 Columbia Music Company

Living people
Year of birth missing (living people)
21st-century American novelists
American women novelists
21st-century American women writers